Epideira perksi is a species of sea snail, a marine gastropod mollusk in the family Horaiclavidae.

Description

Distribution
This marine species is endemic to Australia and occurs off South Australia.

References

 Verco, J.C. 1909. Notes on South Australian marine Mollusca with descriptions of new species. Part XII. Transactions of the Royal Society of South Australia 33: 293–342 
 Hedley, C. 1922. A revision of the Australian Turridae. Records of the Australian Museum 13(6): 213–359, pls 42–56 
 Cotton, B.C. 1947. Australian Recent and Tertiary Turridae. Adelaide : Field Naturalist's Section of the Royal Society of South Australia. Conchology Club Vol. 4 pp. 1–34. 
 Powell, A.W.B. 1966. The molluscan families Speightiidae and Turridae, an evaluation of the valid taxa, both Recent and fossil, with list of characteristic species. Bulletin of the Auckland Institute and Museum. Auckland, New Zealand 5: 1–184, pls 1–23
 Taylor, J.D., Kantor, Y.I. & Sysoev, A.V. 1993. Foregut anatomy, feeding mechanisms, relationships and classification of the Conoidea (=Toxoglossa) (Gastropoda). Bulletin of the British Museum (Natural History) Zoology 59: 125–170
 Wilson, B. 1994. Australian marine shells. Prosobranch gastropods. Kallaroo, WA : Odyssey Publishing Vol. 2 370 pp. 
 Tucker, J.K. 2004. Catalog of Recent and fossil turrids (Mollusca: Gastropoda). Zootaxa 682: 1–1295

External links
 Verco J.C. (1896). Descriptions of new species of marine Mollusca of South Australia. Transactions of the Royal Society of South Australia. 20: 217-232, pls 6-8

perksi
Gastropods described in 1896